The Venersborg School is a historic one-room school located at NE 209th Street and NE 242nd Avenue in Battle Ground, Washington.

Description and history
The school is archetypical of the one room schoolhouse with its simple rectangular plan and gabled roof. The building has served the community which built it from construction to the present day.

Community schoolhouse
The small, red, one-and-one-half story gabled building with a cupola and bell was built in 1912 by John Kullberg. Kullberg, a Swedish immigrant, was a carpenter who also built a number of homes in the community and a church. The building stopped functioning as a school in 1931 when the Battle Ground school district absorbed the student population.

Community activity center
The next year it was purchased by the Venersborg Social and Athletic Club which had formed in 1915. The club was forced to discontinue its popular entertainment due to issues with crowd control. It was listed on the National Register of Historic Places on March 16, 1989. It is listed in the Washington Heritage Register as the state's oldest community center in operation. The roof was replaced by the Venersborg Historic Preservation Society in 2018, the building continues to serve as a center for community activities and a venue for wedding banquets for the church next door. The facility is managed by the Venersborg Community Club.

See also
 Historic preservation
 History of education in the United States
 National Register of Historic Places listings in Clark County, Washington

References

Further reading

External links

 

1912 establishments in Washington (state)
National Register of Historic Places in Clark County, Washington
School buildings completed in 1912
School buildings on the National Register of Historic Places in Washington (state)
Schools in Clark County, Washington